Ren Wenjun (born January 15, 1992, in Binzhou, Shandong) is a Chinese sprint canoeist. She won a gold medal, as a member of the Chinese women's kayak four team, at the 2010 Asian Games in Guangzhou, China, with a time of 1:34.440.

Ren represented China at the 2012 Summer Olympics in London, where she competed in the women's K-4 500 metres, along with her teammates Yu Lamei, Liu Haiping, and Li Zhangli. Ren and her team, however, fell short in their bid for the final, as they finished last in the semi-final round by eighteen hundredths of a second (0.18) behind the Serbian team (led by Antonia Horvat-Panda), recording the slowest time of 1:34.004.

References

External links
NBC Olympics Profile

1992 births
Living people
People from Binzhou
Canoeists from Shandong
Chinese female canoeists
Olympic canoeists of China
Canoeists at the 2012 Summer Olympics
Canoeists at the 2016 Summer Olympics
Asian Games medalists in canoeing
Asian Games gold medalists for China
Asian Games silver medalists for China
Canoeists at the 2010 Asian Games
Canoeists at the 2014 Asian Games
Medalists at the 2010 Asian Games
Medalists at the 2014 Asian Games